Alma mía (English language:My Soul) is a 1999  Argentine romantic comedy film directed by Daniel Barone and written by Jorge Leyes. The film starred Araceli González as Alma.

Cast
 Cristina Allende ....  Madre Valeria
 Valeria Bertuccelli ....  Fanny
 Héctor Bidonde ....  Vito
 Paula Canals ....  Tina
 Rita Cortese ....  Tita
 Antonella Costa ....  Micaela
 Damián de Santo ....  El Tano
 Pablo Echarri ....  Leo
 Roberto Fiore ....  Padre Valeria
 Gabriel Gibot ....  Operador de Radio
 Elena Gowland ....  Enfermera
 Dulio Orso ....  Rubén
 Diego Peretti ....  Mario
 Adriana Salonia ....  Valeria
 Tony Sánchez Pupa ....  Médico
 Rolly Serrano ....  Leche Hervida

Awards
In 2000, Valeria Bertuccelli won a Silver Condor Award for Best Actress while Diego Peretti was nominated for Best Actor.

External links 
 
 

1999 films
1990s Spanish-language films
1999 romantic comedy films
Argentine romantic comedy films
1990s Argentine films